ICL Group Ltd. (Hebrew: איי.סי. אל. גרופ בע"מ) (formerly Israel Chemicals Ltd., ICL) is a multi-national manufacturing concern that develops, produces and markets fertilizers, metals and other special-purpose chemical products. ICL serves primarily three markets: agriculture, food and engineered materials. ICL produces approximately a third of the world's bromine, and is the world's sixth-largest potash producer.  It is a manufacturer of specialty fertilizers and specialty phosphates, flame retardants and water treatment solutions.

ICL is majority controlled by the Israel Corporation, one of the largest Israeli conglomerates. In addition to the Dead Sea Works, Israel Chemicals mines phosphates in the Negev desert.

ICL Group serves customers in Asia.

Operations and business
90% of ICL's sales are exports. Through its subsidiaries, ICL produces 35% of world's bromine, 13% of the world's potash (excluding US-Canada cross-border trade), 9% of the western world's magnesium and 3% of the world's phosphate rock, (excluding US-Canada cross-border trade).

ICL exports fertilizers to Europe and to numerous specialty chemical market segments. In Israel, ICL is the largest supplier of fertilizers and chemicals, as well as one of Israel's largest companies.

60% of ICL's raw products (minerals) are excavated in Israel. ICL also owns and operates underground mines in Spain, United Kingdom (North Yorkshire), China, the United States and South America. Also, in Ethiopia at Danakil mine, Afar Regional State, purchased from Allana Potash Corporation.

Polysulphate
Polysulphate is a brand name for a variety of polyhalite-based fertilizer products, used in farming. Polysulphate is derived from a polyhalite seam that lies  beneath the potash seam at Boulby Mine, England.

Food business 
ICL is active in the market for plant-based meat alternatives and invested $20 million in October 2019 to expand its manufacturing capacity and R&D base.

In December 2021, ICL announced the grand opening of a 10,000 square foot alternative protein production facility in St. Louis, Missouri.

Financials 
In April 2009, the company was said to be considering a bond offering to raise 500 million shekels ($122 million).

ICL announced in September 2018 that it was launching a tender to buy back $800 million worth of 4.5 percent debt due in 2024 sold to bondholders in 2014. The bonds of the new offer are running for 20 to 30 years.

References

External links

 Israel Chemicals acquires Allana Potash for $150m

Fertilizer companies of Israel
Companies listed on the Tel Aviv Stock Exchange
Chemical companies of Israel
Ofer family
Companies listed on the New York Stock Exchange
Manufacturing companies based in Tel Aviv
Formerly government-owned companies of Israel